The Speaker of the Texas House of Representatives is the presiding officer of the Texas House of Representatives.

For more information about the office and powers of the Speaker see Speaker of the Texas House of Representatives.

Republic of Texas
Speakers of the House of Representatives in the Congresses of the Republic of Texas.

State of Texas 

Speakers of the House of Representatives in the Legislatures of the State of Texas.

Notes

References

 
 

.
  
Speakers
Texas